Shakespeare on the Saskatchewan (Shakespeare on the Saskatchewan Festival) is a yearly summer Shakespeare theatre festival founded in 1985 in Saskatoon, Saskatchewan, Canada. In addition to productions of plays by William Shakespeare and his contemporaries, the festival's activities include medieval feasts, workshops, tours, art displays, special matinees, and a free community stage.

History
The festival was founded in part by Gordon McCall in 1985, launching with a production of A Midsummer Night's Dream staged on a golf course. McCall remained artistic director until 1991, when the role was assumed by Henry Woolf, a British-born actor/playwright/director. Between the years 1991 and 2000, Woolf is credited as director on 16 of the festival’s productions. Among these are a number of productions of non-Shakespeare plays, including Harold Pinter's Ashes to Ashes.

Woolf retired as artistic director in 2001, and the role was subsequently filled by Mark von Eschen. Having previously been involved in the festival in a number of roles, including associate artistic director, von Eschen remained in his post until 2014. Von Eschen is credited as having directed roughly 24 productions during this period. Will Brooks took up the position of Artistic Producer following von Eschen's departure, and remained in the position until the festival's 2021 season.

Shakespeare on the Saskatchewan is listed as a Major Festival in the book Shakespeare Festivals Around the World by Marcus D. Gregio (Editor), 2004.

On August 1, 2020, construction was completed on a permanent amphitheatre for the festival, containing 250 seats and three additional buildings for use as a dressing room, bar, and box office.

Production history
The following production history is sourced from the Shakespeare on the Saskatchewan website.

References

External links
 Shakespeare on the Saskatchewan
 The Shakespeare on the Saskatchewan Festival on Trip Advisor
 Tourism Saskatchewan Listing
 Tourism Saskatoon Listing

Festivals in Saskatoon
Theatre festivals in Saskatchewan
Summer festivals
Recurring events established in 1985
Shakespeare festivals in Canada
1985 establishments in Saskatchewan